Olivier Nakache  and Éric Toledano are French filmmakers, best known for directing the films Those Happy Days and The Intouchables (2011).

Early life
Nakache and Toledano are both Jewish.

Nakache was born to Jewish migrant parents from Algeria. His sister is actress and director Géraldine Nakache.

Éric Toledano was born to Jewish migrant parents from Morocco.

Career
Nakache and Toledano collaborated several times before directing The Intouchables (2011), which became one of the greatest box office successes in French film history and for which they were nominated for several awards, including three Cesar Awards. They have collaborated several times with actor Omar Sy, most recently with the 2014 film Samba.

Their 2019 film The Specials stars Vincent Cassel and Reda Kateb. The film shows Parisians from many different groups in society making connections with each other through their work with autistic children and young people.

Nakache and Toledano directed En thérapie, the French version of the Israeli series BeTipul, created by Hagai Levi, about a psychologist and his patients. It debuted on Arte TV in January 2021, starring Frédéric  Pierrot, Mélanie Thierry, Reda Kateb, Clémence Poésy, Pio Marmaï, and Carole Bouquet. The series is set in the aftermath of the Bataclan attack in 2015. A second season was aired from April 2022, with each series comprising 35 episodes. The show aired on SBS Television in Australia as In Therapy.

Filmography

References

External links
 
 

French film directors
French male screenwriters
French screenwriters
Living people
1971 births
1973 births
French people of Algerian-Jewish descent
French people of Moroccan-Jewish descent
French Sephardi Jews
Mizrahi Jews